Fuera del cielo ("Outside the Sky") is a Mexican film that debuted in theaters on January 12, 2007. It was distributed in the United States by Lionsgate Films.

The movie was produced by Argos Comunicación, Fidecine, Videocine and Cinemex Producciones with the collaboration of Estudios Churubusco and Ollin Studio on a budget of 23 million pesos (approximately 2.5 million dollars).

The film was directed by Javier Patrón with script by Guillermo Ríos and Vicente Leñero adapted by an original script by Guillermo Ríos.

Cast

 Demián Bichir as Everardo Sánchez, a.k.a. "El Malboro"
 Armando Hernández as "Cucú" Sánchez
 Damián Alcázar as Officer Rojas
 Rafael Inclán as Uncle Jesús
 Elizabeth Cervantes as Rebeca
 Martha Higareda as Elisa
 Dolores Heredia as Sara
 Itari Martha as Rocío
 Ricardo Blume as Senator García Luna
 Rosa María Bianchi as Mrs. García Luna

Production
Length: 112 min.
Production: Carlos Payán, Epigmenio Ibarra and Inna Payán.
Music: Emmanuel del Real, Ramiro del Real and Renato del Real.

Soundtrack CD includes 10 assorted pop themes, by different Mexican interpreters, and 7 instrumental themes by Emmanuel del Real. Instrumental themes, are synth and vocal chords based, with a very atmospheric texture.

Cinematography: Patrick Murguía
Montage: Jorge García and Javier Patrón
Production design: André Krassoievitch
Wardrobe: Malena de la Riva

Sources

2006 films
2000s Spanish-language films
2006 drama films
Mexican drama films
2000s Mexican films